Polyommatus ariana is a butterfly in the family Lycaenidae. It was described by Frederic Moore in 1865. It is found in the western Himalayas.

References

Butterflies described in 1909
Polyommatus
Butterflies of Asia